Lee Ju-hyoung (born 1977) is a South Korean film director.

Career 
Under the mentorship of director Kim Ki-duk who also wrote, edited and executive produced the film, Lee made his first feature Red Family in 2013. It made its debut and won the Audience Awards at the 2013 Tokyo International Film Festival.

His second feature Fork Lane (2017), also written by Kim, won Best Director at the 21st Tallinn Black Nights Film Festival.

Filmography 
Tapis Roulant (short animation, 2009)
We've Never Seen a Night Which Has Finished by Reaching a Day (mid-length documentary, 2010)
Red Family (2013)
Fork Lane (2017)

Awards 
2017 21st Tallinn Black Nights Film Festival: Best Director (Fork Lane)

References

External links 
 
 

1977 births
Living people
South Korean film directors